Petruzzi is an Italian surname. Notable people with the surname include:

Fabio Petruzzi (born 1970), Italian footballer
Jaime Castillo Petruzzi, Chilean communist militant

Italian-language surnames
Surnames from given names